"Halftime" is the 1992 debut single by American rapper Nas, released under his original moniker of Nasty Nas. It was originally recorded for the Zebrahead soundtrack album, released October 13, 1992, on Ruffhouse Records. "Halftime" was produced by Large Professor and features samples of drums and vocals from "Schoolboy Crush" by Average White Band, horns from "Soul Traveling" by Gary Byrd, and the bassline from "Dead End" from the Japanese cast recording of the musical Hair. The song was later included on Nas' 1994 debut album, Illmatic.

Content
"Halftime" features an up-tempo beat led by percussion and trumpets over which Nas rhymes. Memorable lines include "You couldn't catch me in the streets without a ton of reefer/That's like Malcolm X, catchin' the Jungle Fever" and "I'm as ill as a convict who kills for phone time." Nas also uses this song to give a "shout-outs" to Willie "Ill Will" Graham, Nas' childhood neighbor and best friend, who was shot dead in 1992, and the Queensbridge Crew, a reference to the Queensbridge housing projects in Queens, NY, USA. He also reveals he's a fan of Marcus Garvey, the Jackson 5 and Mr. Magic.

Significance
The inclusion of "Halftime" to the Zebrahead soundtrack by MC Serch led to Nas's breakthrough as a rapper, as a record deal with Columbia Records and the release of his debut album, Illmatic (1994), followed. According to Vibe magazine, the song "created a niche that only Illmatic could fill".

Sampling
Lyrics from "Halftime" are sampled in these songs:
"Exercise" by Akinyele
"Rugged Ruff" by Bahamadia
"We Got It Hemmed" by Cella Dwellas
"Down for the Kaz" by Kazi
"I Will Always Love H.E.R." by Peanut Butter Wolf
"Strike Back" by Army of the Pharaohs
"Vengeance" by East Coast Avengers
"Am I Dope Or What" by Vakill
"Furam Obleku" by Target of Tram 11
"Crazy Like a Foxxx (D.I.T.C. Version)" by Bumpy Knuckles

Track listing
A-side
 "Halftime" (Radio Edit) (4:19)
 "Halftime" (LP Version) (4:19)
 "Halftime" (LP Version Instrumental) (4:19)

B-side
 "Halftime (Butcher Remix)" DJ Bubie (4:41)
 "Halftime (Butcher Instrumental)" (4:42)

Notes

References

External links
 "Halftime" at Discogs

1992 debut singles
Nas songs
Songs written by Nas
Song recordings produced by Large Professor
Hardcore hip hop songs
1992 songs
Columbia Records singles
Ruffhouse Records singles